This is a list of players who played at least one game for the Los Angeles Sharks of the World Hockey Association from 1972–73 to 1973–74.



B
Kirk Bowman,
Mike Byers,

C
Bart Crashley,

D
Brian Derksen,

G
George Gardner,
Ron Garwasiuk,
Russ Gillow,
Tom Gilmore,
Don Gordon,

H
Howie Heggedal,
Earl Heiskala,
Ted Hodgson,
Paul Hoganson,
Bill Horton,
Mike Hyndman,

J
Mike Jakubo,
Bob Jones,

K
Jarda Krupicka,

L
Jean-Paul LeBlanc,

M
Bernie MacNeil,
Ralph MacSweyn,
Larry Mavety,
Ted McCaskill,
Brian McDonald,
Jimmy McLeod,

N
Jim Niekamp,

O
Gerry Odrowski,

P
Bob Perreault,

S
Tom Serviss,
Peter Slater,
Fred Speck,
Steve Sutherland,
Joe Szura,

T
Marc Tardif,
Reg Thomas,

V
Gary Veneruzzo,

W
Ron Walters,
Ron Ward,
Jim Watson,
Alton White,
Bob Whitlock,
Ian Wilkie,
Hal Willis,

Y
Bill Young,

Z
Jerry Zrymiak,

References
Los Angeles Sharks all-time player roster at hockeydb.com

   
Los Angeles Sharks
Los Angeles Sharks players